Pattaya, known as Good Guys Go to Heaven, Bad Guys Go to Pattaya internationally, is a 2016 French comedy film directed by and starring Franck Gastambide.

Plot
Franky (Gastambide) and Krimo (Malik Bentalha) dream of leaving their grim neighborhood for a trip to the famously sleazy Thai resort of Pattaya. To save money the two register their friend Karim (Anouar Toubali) to the Muay Thai Dwarf World Championship, behind his back. But what was to be for them a dream vacation will turn into the craziest and most dangerous adventure of their lives.

Cast
 Franck Gastambide as Francky
 Malik Bentalha as Krimo
 Anouar Toubali as Karim 
 Ramzy Bedia as Reza
 Gad Elmaleh as The Moroccan
 Sabrina Ouazani as Lilia
 Sissi Duparc as Alexandra
 Donia Eden as Aurélie
 Sami Bouajila as Krimo's father
 Fred Testot as Pilot
 Melha Bedia as Stewardess
 Cyril Hanouna as Casting Director

References

External links
 

2016 films
French comedy films
2010s French-language films
2016 comedy films
Gaumont Film Company films
Films shot in Thailand
Films set in Thailand
Films directed by Franck Gastambide
2010s French films